The Los Gatos Union School District is a school district in Los Gatos, California, USA.  It operates the following schools:

Note: Based on 2002-2003 school year data

Residents of this school district are zoned to high schools in the Los Gatos-Saratoga Joint Union High School District.

See also

 Los Gatos High School

References

External links
 

School districts in Santa Clara County, California
Los Gatos, California